The 3rd Canadian Screen Awards were held on March 1, 2015, to honour achievements in Canadian film, television, and digital media production in 2014.

Nominations were announced on January 13, 2015. On the film side, Mommy led with 13 nominations, while on the television side the science fiction series Orphan Black also received 13 nominations.

The awards ceremony were hosted by Andrea Martin at the Four Seasons Centre for the Performing Arts in Toronto, Ontario. Awards in many of the technical categories were presented in a series of galas throughout the week before the main ceremony.

Changes to the awards over previous years included the introduction of new categories for Best Cinematography in a Documentary and Best Editing in a Documentary.

Film

Television

Programs

Actors

News and information

Digital media

Multiple nominations and awards

Special awards
Several special awards were given:
Board of Directors' Tribute: George Anthony
Digital Media Trailblazing Award: Jeffrey Elliott
Earle Grey Award: Paul Gross
Fan Choice Award: Anna Silk
Gordon Sinclair Award: Ric Esther Bienstock
Humanitarian Award: Michael Landsberg
Icon Award: Insight Productions
Legacy Award: Toronto International Film Festival
Margaret Collier Award: Tassie Cameron

References

External links
Canadian Screen Awards

03
2015 in Canadian cinema
2014 film awards
2014 television awards
2015 in Toronto
2015 in Canadian television
2014 awards in Canada